Deutsche Lufthansa AG, commonly shortened to Lufthansa, is the flag carrier of Germany. When combined with its subsidiaries, it is the second-largest airline in Europe in terms of passengers carried. Lufthansa is one of the five founding members of Star Alliance, the world's largest airline alliance, formed in 1997.

Besides its own services, and owning subsidiary passenger airlines Austrian Airlines, Swiss International Air Lines, Brussels Airlines, and Eurowings (referred to in English by Lufthansa as its Passenger Airline Group), Deutsche Lufthansa AG owns several aviation-related companies, such as Lufthansa Technik and LSG Sky Chefs, as part of the Lufthansa Group. In total, the group has over 700 aircraft, making it one of the largest airline fleets in the world.

Lufthansa's registered office and corporate headquarters are in Cologne. The main operations base, called Lufthansa Aviation Center, is at Lufthansa's primary hub at Frankfurt Airport, and its secondary hub is at Munich Airport where a secondary Flight Operations Centre is maintained.

The company was founded as Luftag in 1953 by staff of the former Deutsche Luft Hansa that had been politically connected to the government of Nazi Germany and dissolved after World War II. Luftag continued the traditional branding of the German flag carrier by acquiring the Luft Hansa name and logo.

History

1950s: Post-war (re-)formation

Lufthansa traces its history to 1926 when Deutsche Luft Hansa A.G. (styled as Deutsche Lufthansa from 1933 onwards) was formed in Berlin. DLH, as it was known, was Germany's flag carrier until 1945 when all services were terminated following the defeat of Nazi Germany; it has since been demonstrated that Deutsche Luft Hansa relied on the use of forced labor and housed forced laborers on the site of Tempelhof airport. In an effort to create a new national airline, a company called Aktiengesellschaft für Luftverkehrsbedarf (Luftag), was founded in Cologne on 6 January 1953, with many of its staff having worked for the pre-war Lufthansa; this included Kurt Weigelt, a Nazi convicted of war crimes, who served on the board on the new Lufthansa, and Kurt Knipfer, a member of the Nazi party from 1929 who led Luft Hansa from 1933 to 1945.

West Germany had not yet been granted sovereignty over its airspace, so it was not known when the new airline could become operational. Nevertheless, in 1953 Luftag placed orders for four Convair CV-340s and four Lockheed L-1049 Super Constellations and set up a maintenance base at Hamburg Airport. On 6 August 1954, Luftag acquired the name and logo of the liquidated Deutsche Lufthansa for DM 30,000 (equivalent to € today), thus continuing the tradition of a German flag carrier of that name.

On 1 April 1955 Lufthansa won approval to start scheduled domestic flights, linking Hamburg, Düsseldorf, Frankfurt, Cologne, and Munich. International flights started on 15 May 1955, to London, Paris, and Madrid, followed by Super Constellation flights to New York City from 1 June of that year, and across the South Atlantic from August 1956. In August 1958 fifteen Lufthansa 1049Gs and 1649s left Germany each week to Canada and the United States, three 1049Gs a week flew to South America, three flew to Tehran and one to Baghdad. In parallel, the airline also initiated a marketing campaign to sell itself and West Germany. The challenges involved encouraging travelers to consider visiting the country in the wake of World War II, as well as offering services to other nations via the Frankfurt airport hub. More specifically, Lufthansa's efforts shaped and reflected the development of a modern form of consumerism and advertising through the sale of air travel. By 1963, the airline, initially limited in its public relations efforts, had become a major purveyor of West Germany's image abroad.

The special status of Berlin meant that Lufthansa was not allowed to fly to either part of Berlin until German reunification in 1990. Originally thought to be only a temporary matter (and with intentions to move the airline's headquarters and main base there once the political situation changed), the Division of Germany turned out to be longer than expected, which gradually led to Frankfurt Airport becoming Lufthansa's primary hub.

East Germany tried to establish its airline in 1955 using the Lufthansa name, but this resulted in a legal dispute with West Germany, where Lufthansa was operating. East Germany instead established Interflug as its national airline in 1963, which coincided with the East German Lufthansa being shut down.

1960s: Introduction of jetliners

In 1958 Lufthansa ordered four Boeing 707s and started jet flights from Frankfurt to New York City in March 1960. Boeing 720Bs were later bought to back up the 707 fleets. In February 1961 Far East routes were extended beyond Bangkok, Thailand, to Hong Kong and Tokyo. Lagos, Nigeria, and Johannesburg, South Africa were added in 1962.

Lufthansa introduced the Boeing 727 in 1964 and that May began the Polar route from Frankfurt to Tokyo via Anchorage. In February 1965 the company ordered twenty-one Boeing 737s that went into service in 1968. Lufthansa was the first customer for the Boeing 737 and was one of four buyers of the 737-100s (the others were NASA, Malaysia-Singapore Airlines, and Avianca – while the NASA airframe was the first built, it was the last delivered and originally intended for delivery to Lufthansa). Lufthansa was the first foreign launch customer for a Boeing airliner.

1970s–1980s: The wide-body era
The wide-body era for Lufthansa started with a Boeing 747 flight on 26 April 1970. It was followed by the introduction of the DC-10-30 on 12 November 1973, and the first Airbus A300 in 1976. In 1979 Lufthansa and Swissair became launch customers for the Airbus A310 with an order for twenty-five aircraft.

The company's fleet modernization programme for the 1990s began on 29 June 1985, with an order for fifteen Airbus A320s and seven Airbus A300-600s. Ten Boeing 737-300s were ordered a few days later. All were delivered between 1987 and 1992. Lufthansa also bought Airbus A321, Airbus A340, and Boeing 747-400 aircraft.

In 1987 Lufthansa, together with Air France, Iberia, and Scandinavian Airlines, founded Amadeus, an IT company (also known as a GDS) that would enable travel agencies to sell the founders and other airlines' products from a single system.

Lufthansa adopted a new corporate identity in 1988. The fleet was given a new livery, while cabins, city offices, and airport lounges were redesigned.

1990s–2000s: Further expansion

On 28 October 1990, 25 days after reunification, Berlin became a Lufthansa destination again. On 18 May 1997, Lufthansa, Air Canada, Scandinavian Airlines, Thai Airways International, and United Airlines formed Star Alliance, the world's first multilateral airline alliance.

At the beginning of 1995, Lufthansa made some structural changes aimed at creating independent operating companies of the aviation group, such as Lufthansa Technik, Lufthansa Cargo and Lufthansa Systems. Three new companies who joined later in the Lufthansa Group were LSG Sky Chefs, Condor and Lufthansa CityLine.

In 1999, Lufthansa participated in the German Business Foundation initiative addressing class action lawsuits against German companies for World War II-era misdeeds, including the use of forced labor, by reportedly paying tens of millions German marks. The same year, Lufthansa commissioned the scholar Lutz Budrass to investigate the use of forced labor by its predecessor company, Deutsche Luft Hansa, during World War II; it declined to publish Dr. Budrass's resulting study for more than a decade.

In 2000, Air One became a Lufthansa partner airline and nearly all Air One flights were code-shared with Lufthansa until Alitalia purchased Air One. Lufthansa has a good track record for posting profits, even in 2001, after 9/11, the airline suffered a significant loss in profits but still managed to stay 'in the black'. While many other airlines announced layoffs (typically 20% of their workforce), Lufthansa retained its current workforce.

On 6 December 2001, Lufthansa announced an order for 15 Airbus A380 superjumbos with 10 more options, which was confirmed on 20 December. The A380 fleet would be used for long-haul flights from Frankfurt exclusively.

In June 2003, Lufthansa opened Terminal 2 at Munich's Franz Josef Strauß Airport to relieve its main hub, Frankfurt, which was suffering from capacity constraints. It is one of the first terminals in Europe partially owned by an airline.

On 17 May 2004, Lufthansa became the launch customer for the Connexion by Boeing in-flight online connectivity service.

In autumn 2003, the implementation of a new sales strategy initiated by then-incumbent Executive Vice President Thierry Antinori to make the company fit for the digital era led to the abolition of commission payments for travel agencies and led to a revolution in the German travel business with many travel agencies disappearing from the market on the one hand, and the rise of new digital distribution platforms on the other hand.

On 22 March 2005, Swiss International Air Lines was purchased by Lufthansa's holding company. The acquisition included the provision that the majority shareholders (the Swiss government and large Swiss companies) be offered payment if Lufthansa's share price outperforms an airline index during the years following the merger. The two companies will continue to be run separately.

On 6 December 2006, Lufthansa placed an order for 20 Boeing 747-8s, becoming the launch customer of the passenger model. The airline is also the second European airline to operate the Airbus A380 (after Air France). The first A380 was delivered on 19 May 2010, while the first 747-8 entered service in 2012.

In September 2008, Lufthansa Group announced its intent to purchase a stake in Brussels Airlines (SN). In June 2009, the EU Commission granted regulatory approval and Lufthansa acquired 45% of SN. In September 2016, Lufthansa announced it would purchase the remainder of Brussels Airlines for €2.6 million euros. The transaction was completed in early January 2017. The decision was partially taken after the Brussels airport bombings of March 2016, which caused SN to lose almost €5 million per day until 3 April.

In September 2009, Lufthansa purchased Austrian Airlines with the approval of the European Commission.

On 11 June 2010, Airbus A380 service between Frankfurt and Tokyo (Narita) started.

2010s: Belt-tightening

After a loss of 381 million euros in the first quarter of 2010 and another 13 million loss in the year 2011 due to the economic recession and restructuring costs, Deutsche Lufthansa AG cut 3,500 administrative positions or around 20 percent of the clerical total of 16,800. In 2012, Lufthansa announced a restructuring program called SCORE to improve its operating profit. As a part of the restructuring plan, the company started to transfer all short-haul flights outside its hubs in Frankfurt, Munich, and Düsseldorf to the company's re-branded low-cost carrier Germanwings.

In September 2013, Lufthansa Group announced its biggest order, for 59 wide-body aircraft valued more than 14 billion euros at list prices. Earlier in the same year, Lufthansa placed an order for 100 next-generation narrow-body aircraft.

The group has had a long-standing dispute with the Vereinigung Cockpit union which has demanded a scheme in which pilots can retire at the age of 55, and 60% of their pay be retained, which Lufthansa insists is no longer affordable. Lufthansa pilots were joined by pilots from the group's budget carrier Germanwings to stage a nationwide strike in support of their demands in April 2014 which lasted three days. The pilots staged a six-hour strike at the end of the summer holidays in September 2014, which caused the cancellation of 200 Lufthansa flights and 100 Germanwings flights.

During the course of the 2014 FIFA World Cup, part of the fleet was branded "Fanhansa".

In November 2014, Lufthansa signed an outsourcing deal worth $1.25 billion with IBM that will see the US company take over the airline's IT infrastructure services division and staff.

In June 2015, Lufthansa announced plans to close its small long-haul base at Düsseldorf Airport for economic reasons by October 2015. At the time, the base consisted of two Airbus A340-300s rotating between Newark and Chicago. As a result, service to Chicago from Düsseldorf was first made seasonal, suspended for the winter 2015 season, and then canceled altogether. Service to Newark, however, was initially maintained. From the winter 2015 schedule through the end of the winter 2016 schedule, Düsseldorf was served by aircraft which also flew the Munich-Newark route. The Düsseldorf-Newark route ended on 30 November 2018, which was operated with an Airbus A330-300 aircraft. Their base was officially closed in March 2019.

On 22 March 2016, Lufthansa ended Boeing 737-500 operations. The airline's last Boeing 737 (a 737-300) was retired on 29 October 2016, after a flight from Milan to Frankfurt. Lufthansa operated the 737 in several variants for almost 50 years, the first aircraft having been delivered on 27 December 1967.

On 4 December 2017, Lufthansa became the first European airline to receive the Skytrax 5 star certification. As stated by Skytrax, a key factor in the positive rating was the announcement of a new Business Class cabin and seating that was expected to be introduced in 2020. While this makes Lufthansa the 10th airline to be holding this award, in reality the 5th star was given to a product that was supposed to be introduced two years after the evaluation. In celebration, Lufthansa painted an Airbus A320 and a Boeing 747-8 in the "5 Starhansa" livery.

In March 2018, Lufthansa and other airlines like British Airways and American Airlines accepted a request from Beijing to list Taiwan as part of China.

In March 2019 Lufthansa ordered 20 Boeing 787-9 and an additional 20 Airbus A350-900 for its own and the group's fleet replacement and expansion. Also, the airline announced it would sell six A380 aircraft back to Airbus, beginning in 2022.

2020s: COVID-19 pandemic and recovery
On 19 March 2020 Lufthansa cancelled 95 percent of all flights due to a travel ban because of the COVID-19 pandemic. Consequently, the airline incurred losses of 1 million euros per hour by April 2020. While Lufthansa reduced its costs throughout 2020, continuing health risks and travel restrictions still caused hourly losses of approximately 500,000 euros on average at the beginning of 2021.

On 14 May, Lufthansa Group announced that it planned to operate 1,800 weekly flights by the end of June. The company's recovery plans involved high-density cargo to replace paying customers. All Lufthansa Group required all passengers to wear a mask while aboard.

On 25 June, Deutsche Lufthansa AG shareholders accepted a  bailout, consisting of capital measures and the participation of the Economic Stabilisation Fund (WSF) of the Federal Ministry for Economic Affairs and Energy. The measures, which passed after initial opposition by principal shareholder Heinz Hermann Thiele, gave the government a 20% stake in the airline.

In January 2021, Lufthansa CEO Spohr announced that the entire currently stored Airbus A340-600 fleet will be retired with immediate effect and not return to service anymore. This decision was later overturned with several A340-600 aircraft returning to service in 2021 after several months in storage. In June 2021, Lufthansa said it wants to repay state aid it received during the pandemic before Germany's federal election in September 2021 if possible. Also in June 2021, Lufthansa said it would change its communications to adopt a more gender-neutral and inclusive language. It will remove greetings such as "Ladies and Gentlemen".

In January 2022 Lufthansa admitted it had operated over 18,000 empty flights to keep airport slots during the pandemic.

In March 2022, Lufthansa originally confirmed that its entire Airbus A380 fleet would be retired, having been in storage since early 2020. This decision was reversed in June 2022, with plans to now return up to five aircraft from storage by 2023 to be based at Munich Airport. There is also an option to return all remaining eight A380 back to service by 2024, as six of formerly 14 have already been sold.

In May 2022, Skytrax demoted Lufthansa from its aforementioned 5 star rating which it held since 2017 as the first European carrier to do so, to an overall 4 star rating.

In 2023, the airline was affected by an IT glitch leaving thousands of passengers stranded around the world. According to the German air traffic control agency, the airlines flights were redirected from Frankfurt to other airports due to an IT glitch. The issue was reportedly caused after construction work cut through fiber optic cables in the city.

Corporate affairs

Ownership 
Lufthansa was a state-owned enterprise until 1994. Deutsche Lufthansa AG shares have been publicly traded on all German stock exchanges since 1966. In addition to floor trading, it is also traded electronically using the Xetra system. It is a DAX index share and is listed in the Frankfurt Stock Exchange's Prime Standard. At the end of 2019, the shareholders’ register showed that German investors held 67.3% of the shares (previous year: 72.1%). The second-largest group, with 10.4%, was shareholders from Luxembourg. Investors from the US accounted for 8.1%, followed by Ireland and the United Kingdom, each with 3.6%. This ensures compliance with the provisions of the German Aviation Compliance Documentation Act (LuftNaSiG). As of the reporting date, 58% of the shares were held by institutional investors (previous year: 53%), and 42% were held by private individuals (previous year: 47%). Lansdowne Partners International Ltd. and BlackRock, Inc. were the largest shareholders in the Lufthansa Group at year-end, with 4.9% and 3.1% respectively. All the transactions requiring disclosure and published during the financial year 2019, as well as the quarterly updates on the shareholder structure, are available online. During the 2020 COVID crisis Heinz Hermann Thiele increased his stake to more than 12%; he died a few months later. The free float for Lufthansa shares was 67% in 2020, as per the definition of the Deutsche Börse.

German government bail-out
The German government offered a €9 billion bailout to support the airline through COVID-19 induced economic issues. With this bailout, the government's stake in the airline increased to 20%, and also grant it board seats, while diluting existing shareholder stakes. The shareholders of the company approved the bailout on Thursday, June 26, offering the airline a fresh lease of life.

Business trends
Key business and operating results of the Lufthansa Group for recent years are shown below (as at year ending 31 December):

Headquarters 

Lufthansa's corporate headquarters are in Cologne. In 1971, Lawrence Fellows of The New York Times described the then-new headquarters building that Lufthansa occupied in Cologne as "gleaming". In 1986, Left-wing terrorists bombed the building. No one was injured. In 2006, builders laid the first stone of the new Lufthansa headquarters in Deutz, Cologne. By the end of 2007, Lufthansa planned to move 800 employees, including the company's finance department, to the new building. However, in early 2013 Lufthansa revealed plans to relocate its head office from Cologne to Frankfurt by 2017.

Several Lufthansa departments are not at the headquarters; instead they are in the Lufthansa Aviation Center at Frankfurt Airport. These departments include Corporate Communications and Investor Relations.

Airline subsidiaries

In addition to its main passenger operation, Lufthansa has several airline subsidiaries, including:

Wholly owned by Lufthansa
 Lufthansa German Airlines
 Lufthansa Regional – regional feeder entity
 Lufthansa CityLine – German regional airline headquartered in Munich and part of Lufthansa Regional
 Air Dolomiti – Italian regional airline headquartered in Villafranca di Verona and part of Lufthansa Regional
 Eurowings Discover German long- and medium-haul leisure airline
 Network Airlines
 Austrian Airlines – the flag carrier airline of Austria based at Vienna International Airport 
 Swiss International Air Lines – the flag carrier airline of Switzerland based at Zurich Airport
 Edelweiss Air – Swiss leisure airline subsidiary
 Brussels Airlines – the flag carrier airline of Belgium based at Brussels Airport
 Eurowings Group (low-cost or hybrid point-to-point airlines)
 Eurowings – German low-cost airline headquartered in Düsseldorf
 Eurowings Europe – low-cost airline registered in Austria
 Lufthansa Cargo – German cargo airline headquartered in Frankfurt, formerly German Cargo

Partly owned by Lufthansa
 AeroLogic – German cargo airline owned by a joint-venture of Lufthansa (50%) and DHL (50%)
 SunExpress – Turkish leisure airline jointly owned by Lufthansa (50%) and Turkish Airlines (50%)

Former
British Midland International (2009–2011, stake owned since 1999) – British airline subsidiary sold to International Airlines Group and merged into British Airways in 2012
Condor Flugdienst (1959–2004, stakes owned from 1955 until 2006) – former leisure subsidiary, shares gradually acquired by Thomas Cook AG, later owned by Thomas Cook Group
German Cargo (1977–1993) – cargo subsidiary, reorganized into the current Lufthansa Cargo
Luftfahrtgesellschaft Walter – German low-cost regional airline integrated into Eurowings in October 2017, sold to Zeitfracht in 2019
Lufthansa Italia (2009–2011) – Italian airline subsidiary established, sharing IATA, ICAO, and callsigns with the main Lufthansa
SunExpress Deutschland (2011–2020) – German subsidiary of SunExpress

Other subsidiaries
In addition to the airlines mentioned above, Lufthansa maintains further aviation affiliated subsidiaries:

 Global Load Control, a world leader in remote weight and balance services.
 LSG Sky Chefs, the world's largest airline caterer, which accounts for one-third of the world's airline meals.
 Lufthansa Consulting, an international aviation consultancy for airlines, airports, and related industries.
 Lufthansa Flight Training, a provider of flight crew training services to various airlines and the main training arm for the airline's pilots.
 Lufthansa Systems, the largest European aviation IT provider.
 Lufthansa Technik, aircraft maintenance providers.
 Lufthansa City Center International, a network of independent travel agents who are Lufthansa franchisees
 Lufthansa AirPlus Servicekarten GMBH, (AirPlus International) travel payment company via UATP and Mastercard.

Branding

The Lufthansa logo, an encircled stylized crane in flight, was first created in 1918 by Otto Firle. It was part of the livery of the first German airline, Deutsche Luft-Reederei (abbreviated DLR), which began air service on 5 February 1919. In 1926, Deutsche Luft Hansa adopted this symbol, and in 1954, Lufthansa expressed continuity by adopting it and later in 1963 – a variant thereof as redesigned by Robert Lisovskyi.

The original creator of the name Lufthansa is believed to be F.A. Fischer von Puturzyn. In 1925, he published a book entitled "Luft-Hansa" which examined the options open to aviation policymakers at the time. Luft Hansa was the name given to the new airline, which resulted from the merger of Junkers' airline (Luftverkehr AG) and Deutscher Aero Lloyd.

After World War II, the company kept blue and yellow as its main colours and the crane logo. Since the beginning of the 1960s, Helvetica was used for the company name in the livery. The 1970s retro livery featured the top half of the fuselage painted in all-white on top and the lower fuselage (bottom half, including the engines) was gray/silver aluminium, below a blue cheatline window band and a black painted nose. The crane logo was painted blue on the engines, on the bottom half of the fuselage just below the cockpit windows, and a yellow circle inside a blue band on the tail.

German designer Otl Aicher created a comprehensive corporate design for the airline in 1967. The crane logo was now always displayed in a circle which, on the livery, was yellow on an otherwise blue tailfin. Helvetica was used as the main typeface for both the livery and publications. The blue band and general paint scheme of the aircraft were retained from the previous livery.

Aicher's concept was retained in the 1988 design. The window band was removed and the fuselage was painted in grey.

In 2018, Lufthansa changed their livery. The encircled crane was retained, and the background changed from yellow to dark blue. The vertical stabilizer and the rear fuselage were painted in dark blue, and the tail cone remained white. The main fuselage was painted in all white, and the brand name "Lufthansa" was painted above the windows, also in dark blue.

The company slogan is 'Say yes to the world.'

Alliances and partnerships

Commercial
Lufthansa bought a 19% stake in JetBlue Airways in December 2007 and entered a code-sharing agreement with the airline. It was the first major investment by a European carrier in an American carrier since the EU–U.S. Open Skies Agreement came into effect in 2008. Lufthansa sold its stake in JetBlue in March 2015.

In late 2007, Lufthansa Cargo was forced to relocate a hub from Kazakhstan to Russia.

On 28 August 2008, Lufthansa and Brussels Airlines announced that they were negotiating a merger.

Lufthansa acquired a 45% stake in Brussels Airlines in 2009. It has an option to acquire the remaining 55% by 2017. As a part of the deal Brussels Airlines joined Star Alliance in December 2009.

On 28 October 2008, Lufthansa exercised its option to purchase a further 60% share in BMI (in addition to the 20% Lufthansa already owned), this resulted in a dispute with the former owner Sir Michael Bishop. Both parties reached an agreement at the end of June 2009, and the acquisition took place with effect from 1 July 2009. Lufthansa acquired the remaining 20% from Scandinavian Airlines on 1 November 2009, taking complete control of BMI.

Lufthansa completed the purchase of Austrian Airlines from the Austrian government in January 2009.

In 2010, Lufthansa was named in a European Commission investigation into price-fixing, but was not fined because it acted as a whistleblower.

In April 2012, Lufthansa completed the sale of BMI to International Airlines Group (IAG), owner of British Airways and Iberia for £172.5 million.

In July 2012, a Qantas–Lufthansa Technik maintenance deal for Tullamarine airport fell through due to having insufficient engine maintenance work to support the partnership. This resulted in 164 engineers being made redundant. This followed just months after the closing of heavy maintenance operations, which resulted in 400 additional job losses. It was announced that the Lufthansa Technik–Qantas partnership would end in September.

Lufthansa also coordinates scheduling and ticket sales on transatlantic flights with Air Canada and United Airlines (as do Brussels Airlines, Swiss and Austrian Airlines). Lufthansa (with Swiss and Austrian Airlines) cooperates similarly with ANA on flights to Japan. Both ventures required the approval of competition authorities.

Technology
Until April 2009 Lufthansa inventory and departure control systems, based on Unisys were managed by LH Systems. Lufthansa reservations systems were outsourced to Amadeus in the early 1990s. Following a decision to outsource all components of the Passenger Service System, the functions were outsourced to the Altéa platform managed by Amadeus.

Partner airlines
Lufthansa describes Air Malta, Luxair, and LATAM  as partner airlines. The partnerships mainly involve code-sharing and recognition of each other's frequent flier programmes.

Sponsorships
Lufthansa sponsors Bundesliga club Eintracht Frankfurt. The Lufthansa Group also sponsors the German Sports Aid Foundation to promote its sociopolitical goals and the athletes it sponsors.

Destinations

Codeshare agreements
Lufthansa codeshares with the following airlines:

 Aegean Airlines
 Air Astana
 airBaltic
 Air Canada
 Air China
 Air Dolomiti LH
 Air India
 Air Malta
 Air New Zealand
 All Nippon Airways
 Asiana Airlines
 Austrian Airlines LH
 Avianca
 Brussels Airlines LH
 Cathay Pacific
 Copa Airlines
 Croatia Airlines
 EgyptAir
 Ethiopian Airlines
 Etihad Airways
 Eurowings LH
 Iran Air
 ITA Airways
 LATAM Airlines
 LOT Polish Airlines
 Luxair
 Scandinavian Airlines
 Shenzhen Airlines
 Singapore Airlines
 South African Airways
 SunExpress LH
 Swiss International Air Lines LH
 TAP Air Portugal
 Thai Airways International
 Turkish Airlines
 United Airlines
 Vistara

LH Part of the Lufthansa Group.

Fleet

Aircraft naming conventions
In September 1960, a Lufthansa Boeing 707 (D-ABOC), which would serve the Frankfurt-New York intercontinental route, was christened Berlin after the divided city of Berlin by then-mayor Willy Brandt. Following Berlin, other Lufthansa 707 planes were named "Hamburg", "Frankfurt", "München", and "Bonn." With these names, the company established a tradition of naming the planes in its fleet after German cities and towns or federal states, with a rule of thumb that the airplane make, size, or route would correspond roughly to the relative size or importance of the city or town it was named after.

This tradition continued, with two notable exceptions, until 2010: The first was an Airbus A340-300 registered D-AIFC, named "Gander/Halifax", after Gander and Halifax, two Canadian cities along the standard flight path from Europe to North America. It became the first Lufthansa airplane named after a non-German city. The name commemorates the hospitality of the communities of Gander and Halifax, which served as improvised safe havens for the passengers and crew of the multitude of international aircraft unable to return to their originating airports during Operation Yellow Ribbon after the September 11, 2001 attacks. The other aircraft not named after a German city was an Airbus A321-100 registered as D-AIRA, which was designated Finkenwerder in honor of the Airbus facility in the district of Hamburg-Finkenwerder, where about 40% of Airbus narrowbody models are manufactured.

In February 2010, Lufthansa announced that its first two Airbus A380s would be named Frankfurt am Main (D-AIMA) and München (D-AIMB) after Lufthansa's two hub airports. Subsequent A380 aircraft were named after other Lufthansa Group hub airports Zurich, Wien (Vienna) and Brüssel (Brussels) and the major German cities of Düsseldorf and Berlin. The remaining A380s were named after Star Alliance hub cities Tokyo, Beijing, Johannesburg, New York, San Francisco and Delhi. However, D-AIMN San Francisco was renamed Deutschland (Germany) in 2016.

As of 2016, there are several short- and long-haul aircraft in Lufthansa's fleet that do not bear any name. They either never received one or their former one has been given to a newer aircraft, which was the case for several Boeing 747-400s. For example, the former Bayern (Bavaria), a Boeing 747-400 still in active service lost that name to a new Boeing 747-8I.

Vintage aircraft restoration
Lufthansa Technik, the airline's maintenance arm, restored a Junkers Ju 52/3m built in 1936 to airworthiness; this aircraft was in use on the 10-hour Berlin to Rome route, across the Alps, in the 1930s. Lufthansa is now restoring a Lockheed Super Constellation, using parts from three such aircraft bought at auctions. Lufthansa's Super Constellations and L1649 "Starliners" served routes such as Hamburg-Madrid-Dakar-Caracas-Santiago. Lufthansa Technik recruits retired employees and volunteers for skilled labour.

Airbus A380
Lufthansa had initially ordered a total of 15 Airbus A380-800, of which by June 2012 ten were delivered. In September 2011, the order was increased by two more to 17, this order was confirmed on 14 March 2013. However, in September 2013 it was announced that the Lufthansa Supervisory Board had approved the purchase of only twelve of the first 15 A380s. Thus, a total of 14 A380s have been added to the fleet.

Lufthansa uses its A380s from and to Frankfurt am Main (9 aircraft) and since March 2018 to and from Munich as well (5 aircraft). From 6 to 12 December 2011, Lufthansa already used an A380 once a day on the route from Munich to New York-JFK. This happened mainly against the backdrop of Christmas shopping in New York City.

On 13 March 2019, Lufthansa announced that it will be removing 6 A380 aircraft from the fleet and replacing them with Boeing 787-9 and Airbus A350-900 aircraft.

On 8 March 2020, Lufthansa announced that it would be grounding all of its A380 aircraft due to the COVID-19 pandemic.

On December 2, 2022, Lufthansa ungrounded one of its A380s. After 3 years in storage, D-AIMK a 9 year old Airbus A380-800 leaves storage. Its flight departs from Teruel Airport to Frankfurt Airport, Lufthansa’s main hub. The aircraft can’t retract its landing gear, so it flies slower and lower during the extended 3 hour flight. It should enter official service by summer of 2023.

Lufthansa announced on 27 June 2022 that the remaining fleet of eight A380s will be reactivated and brought back into service for the 2023 summer season. The stronger than anticipated customer demand and quicker recovery of international travel from the pandemic is cited as one of two reasons. The other reason is the persistent delay of Boeing 777-9 delivery, which Lufthansa would not receive until 2025 or later. Lufthansa is still assessing how many and which A380 will be reactivated and which route the A380 will serve again.

Current Fleet

Future Fleet 
Lufthansa will Replace their Airbus A340-300 and Airbus A340-600 with Airbus A350-900 and Airbus A350-1000, and their Boeing 747-400 will be replaced with 777-9 once they arrive in 2025. Lufthansa is also cosidering to replace their Embraer E190, Embraer E195 and Bombardier CRJ-900 with either the new Embraer-E2 Jets or the Airbus A220-Family

Services

Frequent-flyer programme

Lufthansa's frequent-flyer programme is called Miles & More, and is shared among several European airlines, including all of Lufthansa's subsidiary airlines (excluding the SunExpress joint ventures), plus Condor (formerly owned by Lufthansa), Croatia Airlines, LOT Polish Airlines, and Luxair (previously part-owned by Lufthansa). Miles & More members may earn miles on Lufthansa flights and Star Alliance partner flights, as well as through Lufthansa credit cards, and purchases made through the Lufthansa shops. Status within Miles & More is determined by miles flown during one calendar year with specific partners. Membership levels include: Miles & More member (no minimal threshold), Frequent Traveller (Silver,  threshold or 30 individual flights), Senator (Gold,  threshold), and HON Circle (Black,  threshold over two calendar years). All Miles & More status levels higher than Miles & More member offer lounge access and executive bonus miles, with the higher levels offering more exclusive benefits.

Cabins

First Class

First Class is offered on most long-haul aircraft (all Airbus A340-600s, the front part of the upper deck of all Airbus A380s, and the nose of the main deck of all Boeing 747-8Is). Each seat converts to a  bed, includes laptop power outlets, as well as entertainment facilities. Meals are available on demand. Lufthansa offers dedicated First Class check-in counters at most airports, and offers dedicated First Class lounges in Frankfurt and Munich, as well as a dedicated first-class terminal in Frankfurt. Arriving passengers have the option of using Lufthansa's First Class arrival facilities, as well as the new Welcome Lounge. Lufthansa introduced a new First Class product aboard the Airbus A380 and planned to gradually introduce it on all of its long-haul aircraft. However, with the new program SCORE, introduced to boost profits by 1.5 billion euros over the following years, Lufthansa halted route expansion and extensively decreased its First Class offerings on most routes. In October 2022, a new suite style First Class product was unveiled, and will be introduced on new A350 deliveries in 2023. In 2017 the airline announced that its first few Boeing 777-9s would not include First Class seats, however, First Class could be installed on later deliveries.  the only remaining First Class seats Lufthansa offered were on its Boeing 747-8Is, with 10 Airbus A350-900s with First Class seats

Business Class

Business Class is offered on all long-haul aircraft. Seats convert to  lie-flat beds and include laptop power outlets and entertainment facilities. Lufthansa offers dedicated Business Class check-in counters at all airports, as well as dedicated Business Class lounges at most airports, or contract lounges at other airports, as well as the Lufthansa Welcome Lounge upon arrival in Frankfurt. As of 2014, Business Class on all wide-body aircraft feature lie-flat seats. Lufthansa released plans for a new business class set to be released in 2023 on the Boeing 787-9 and Airbus A350, and will retrofit the rest of the fleet in the coming years.

Premium Economy
Introduced in 2014, Lufthansa's long-haul Premium Economy was rolled out on all long-haul aircraft, starting with some Boeing 747-8Is. Similar in design to Air Canada's Premium Economy or British Airways' World Traveller Plus cabins, Premium Economy features  pitch along with up to  more width than economy class, depending on the aircraft. The seats also feature a  personal seat-back entertainment screen and a larger armrest separating seats. Along with the planned introduction of the Boeing 777-9X, the airline plans to add a new Premium Economy cabin with a "shell" design. These seats are also to be installed on SWISS' Boeing 777-300ERs and Airbus A340-300s from the first and second quarter of 2021, respectively.

Economy Class

Lufthansa's long-haul Economy Class is offered on all long-haul aircraft. All have a  seat pitch except the Airbus A380s, which have a  seat pitch. Passengers receive meals, as well as free drinks. The whole fleet offers Audio-Video-On-Demand (AVOD) screens in Economy Class.

Airport lounges and terminals

Lufthansa operates four types of lounges within its destination network: First Class, Senator, Business, and Welcome Lounges. Each departure lounge is accessible both through travel class, or Miles and More/Star Alliance status; the Welcome Lounge is limited to arriving premium passengers of the Lufthansa Group and United Airlines only.

Lufthansa also operates a dedicated first class terminal at Frankfurt Airport. The first terminal of its kind, access is limited only to departing Lufthansa First Class, same day Lufthansa Group first class and HON Circle members. Approximately 200 staff care for approximately 300 passengers per day in the terminal, which features a full-service restaurant, full bar, cigar lounge, relaxation rooms, and offices, as well as bath facilities. Guests are driven directly to their departing flight by Mercedes S-Class or V-Class, or Porsche Cayenne or Panamera vehicles.

Bus service
A bus service from Nuremberg Airport to Munich Airport was reinstated in 2021 to replace short-haul flights between both cities.  Lufthansa operated a check-in point in Nuremberg and a bus service from Nuremberg to Munich Airport in the late 1990s.

Accidents and incidents
This is a list of accidents and incidents involving Lufthansa mainline aircraft since 1956. For earlier occurrences, refer to Deutsche Luft Hansa. For accidents and incidents on Lufthansa-branded flights which were operated by other airlines, see the respective articles (Lufthansa CityLine, Lufthansa Cargo, Contact Air, Germanwings, and Air Dolomiti).

Fatal
 On 11 January 1959, Lufthansa Flight 502, a Lufthansa Lockheed Super Constellation (registered D-ALAK) crashed onto a beach shortly off Galeão Airport in Rio de Janeiro following a scheduled passenger flight from Hamburg, Germany. Of the 29 passengers and 10 crew members on board, only the co-pilot and 2 flight attendants survived. The investigation into the accident resulted in blaming the pilots for having executed a too low approach, which may have been caused by fatigue.
 On 4 December 1961, a Lufthansa Boeing 720 (registered D-ABOK) crashed of unknown causes near Mainz during a training flight from Frankfurt to Cologne, killing the three occupants. It was the first crash involving an aircraft of that type.
 On 15 July 1964, another Boeing 720 (registered D-ABOP) crashed during a training flight, with the three people, including Werner Baake, on board losing their lives (in what was only the second crash for this aircraft type). The accident occurred near Ansbach after the pilots had lost control of the aircraft when executing an aileron roll.
 On 28 January 1966 at 17:50 local time, Lufthansa Flight 005 from Frankfurt to Bremen, which was operated using a Convair CV-440 Metropolitan registered D-ACAT, crashed  short of Bremen Airport, killing all 42 passengers and 4 crew members on board. The pilots had tried to execute a go-around when approaching the airport, during which the aircraft stalled and went out of control, possibly due to pilot error.
  On 20 November 1974 at 07:54 local time, Lufthansa Flight 540, a Boeing 747-100 (registered D-ABYB), lost power and crashed shortly after take-off at Jomo Kenyatta International Airport in what was the first air accident involving a Boeing 747. 55 out of the 140 passengers and 4 out of the 17 crew lost their lives, making it the worst accident in the history of the airline.
 On 26 July 1979 at 21:32 UTC, a cargo-configured Boeing 707 (registered D-ABUY) that was en route Lufthansa Flight 527 from Rio de Janeiro to Dakar and onwards to Germany crashed into a mountain  from Galeão Airport during initial climb, killing the three crew members on board. A flawed communication between the pilots and the air traffic controller had resulted in the aircraft flying on a wrong path.
 In January 1984, a woman was found dead in a suitcase which was lying on an LAXbaggage carousel for a while. The suitcase had arrived on a Lufthansa flight. The woman was later discovered to have been an Iranian citizen who had recently married another Iranian with UGreen card status. She had been denied a US visa in West Germany and therefore decided to enter the US like this.
 On 14 September 1993, Lufthansa Flight 2904, an Airbus A320-200 (registered D-AIPN) flying from Frankfurt to Warsaw with 64 passengers and 4 crew members on board, overran the runway upon landing at Warsaw-Okecie Airport, and crashed into an earth embankment, resulting in the death of the co-pilot and one passenger.
 On May 28, 1999, German border police suffocated to death Aamir Ageeb, whom they were escorting aboard Lufthansa Flight 588 from Frankfurt to Cairo. During takeoff, the officers restrained and pinned down Ageeb, a Sudanese man deported from Germany after being rejected for asylum. The aircraft made an emergency landing in Munich. The incident led to the German interior ministry suspending its policy of forcible air deportation, and contributed to protests over Lufthansa's role in transporting deported asylum seekers.

Non-fatal
 On 20 December 1973 at 00:33 local time, a Lufthansa Boeing 707 (registered D-ABOT) with 98 passengers and 11 crew members on board collided with a middle marker shack upon approaching Palam Airport in Delhi following a scheduled passenger flight from Bangkok (as part of a multi-leg flight back to Germany). There were no injuries, but the aircraft was damaged beyond repair. Visibility was poor at the time of the accident.
 On 18 October 1983, a Boeing 747-200 freighter ran off the runway at Kai Tak airport in Hong Kong and got bogged in the grass after an engine failure during take-off.
 On 11 June 2018, one of the airline's Airbus A340-300s, registered as D-AIFA, was being towed to its departure gate at Frankfurt Airport when the towing vehicle caught fire. Despite the quick action of the airport fire brigade, the aircraft suffered substantial fire and smoke damage to the nose and flight deck. Six people were treated for smoke inhalation.
 In 2023, Lufthansa Flight 469 experienced clear-air turbulence.

Hijackings and criminal events
 In 1972, the year of the Munich Summer Olympics, there were four reported hijackings involving Lufthansa aircraft:
 On 22 February, Flight 649, a Boeing 747-200 (registered D-ABYD) with 172 passengers and 15 crew members on board was hijacked en route from New Delhi to Athens (as part of a multi-leg flight from Tokyo to Frankfurt) by five Popular Front for the Liberation of Palestine terrorists who then pressed for a $5 million ransom from the German government. The aircraft landed at Aden International Airport, and the hostages were released on the following day once the demands of the perpetrators were accepted.
 On 10 July, a similar hijacking attempt occurred on board a Lufthansa Boeing 737-100 during a flight from Cologne to Munich.
 11 October a Boeing 727 was hijacked on a flight from Lisbon to Frankfurt. Upon landing at Frankfurt Airport, the perpetrator tried to flee but was captured by police forces.
 On 29 October, two men hijacked Flight 615 with 11 other passengers and 7 crew members on board during a flight from Beirut to Ankara (and onwards to Germany), in order to liberate the three surviving members of the Black September group responsible for the Munich massacre. Whilst the hijacked Boeing 727 (registered D-ABIG) was forced to circle over Zagreb Airport in danger of eventual fuel starvation, the West German authorities decided to comply with the demands. The prisoners were handed over and the aircraft was allowed to be flown to Tripoli, where the hostages were released.
 On 17 December 1973, in the wake of the events surrounding Pan Am Flight 110, a parked Lufthansa Boeing 737-100 (registered D-ABEY) was hijacked at Leonardo da Vinci-Fiumicino Airport in Rome. 10 Italian hostages that had been taken by Palestinian terrorists at the airport were forced into the aircraft by 5 perpetrators, and the German crew (2 pilots and 2 flight attendants) that was on board preparing the departure to Munich had to fly the aircraft instead first to Athens and then to several other airports until the ordeal ended at Kuwait International Airport the next day, where the hijackers surrendered.
 On 28 June 1977, a Lufthansa Boeing 727 was hijacked during a flight from Frankfurt to Istanbul and forced to divert to Munich.
 The Hijacking of the Landshut occurred on 13 October 1977, at a time when West Germany had come under intense terroristic pressure known as German Autumn. The Boeing 737-200 (registered D-ABCE) was hijacked en route Flight 181 from Palma de Mallorca to Frankfurt by 4 terrorists of the Popular Front for the Liberation of Palestine, who thus wanted to force the German government to release several RAF terrorists. The crew had to divert the aircraft with 87 other passengers first to Rome, and then onwards to Larnaca, Bahrain, Dubai, Aden (where the captain was killed when he returned to the aircraft after negotiations with the local authorities), and finally to Mogadishu in an ordeal that took several days. At Mogadishu Airport, the German GSG 9 special forces stormed the aircraft in the early hours of 18 October local time, killing 3 terrorists and freeing all hostages.
On December 11, 1978, Lufthansa was the victim of a major heist (robbery) at John F. Kennedy International Airport. The Lufthansa heist led to Lufthansa losing about $5 million American Dollars. 
 On 12 September 1979, a hijacking attempt occurred on board a Lufthansa Boeing 727 on a flight from Frankfurt to Cologne, but the perpetrator quickly surrendered.
 Three hijackings occurred in due course in early 1985:
 On 27 February, a Boeing 727 was hijacked en route a Lufthansa flight from Frankfurt to Damascus. Two perpetrators forced the pilots to divert the aircraft (with 35 other passengers on board) to Vienna International Airport, where they surrendered.
 On 27 March, another 727 was hijacked, this time on a flight from Munich to Athens. A man demanded the pilots to divert to Libya. During a fuel stop at Istanbul, the aircraft was stormed and the perpetrator arrested.
 Only two days later, a mentally ill person on board a Lufthansa Boeing 737-200 on a flight from Hamburg to London demanded to be taken to Hawaii instead.
 On 11 February 1993, Lufthansa Flight 592 from Frankfurt to Addis Ababa via Cairo with 94 passengers and 10 crew members was hijacked during the first leg by 20-year-old Nebiu Zewolde Demeke, who forced the pilots to divert the Airbus A310 (registered D-AIDM) to the United States, with the intent of securing the right of asylum there. Demeke, who had been on the flight to be deported back to his native Ethiopia, surrendered to authorities upon arrival at John F. Kennedy International Airport in New York City. No passengers or crew members were harmed during the 12-hour ordeal.

Criticism

Employment relations
Relations between Lufthansa and their pilots have been very tense in the past years, with many strikes occurring, causing many flights to be cancelled, as well as major losses to the company. A major dispute between Lufthansa and the pilot's union has been settled after nearly five years and overall 14 strikes in December 2017. Without taking into account the €9 billion bailout from the German government, Lufthansa cut 31,000 jobs in the COVID19 years. During the 2022 collective bargaining, ver.di said that Lufthansa's wage offer meant real wage losses for employees and called on around 20,000 ground workers in Germany to go on warning strikes.

Germanwings crisis management

Germanwings was a subsidiary of Lufthansa. Carsten Spohr, Lufthansa's CEO, oversaw the Germanwings Flight 9525 incident, "the darkest day for Lufthansa in its 60-year history", when pilot Andreas Lubitz intentionally flew an aircraft into a mountain, murdering 149 passengers.

Nonetheless, damage control by Spohr and his team was poor according to several sources, as compared to other CEOs in the face of a major accident, with contradictory information given about the mental health and the airworthiness of the co-pilot Andreas Lubitz. It was revealed that Lubitz suffered from a severe case of depression and mental disorders and had intentionally crashed Germanwings Flight 9525 into the French Alps, killing all 150 aboard. Spohr had misleadingly said the co-pilot "was 100% airworthy without any restrictions, without any conditions".

GDS surcharge
On 1 September 2015, Lufthansa implemented a 16 euro surcharge on Global Distribution System bookings. The surcharge is payable unless tickets are purchased directly from the airline's website, or at its service centres and ticket counters at the airport. In a statement responding to Lufthansa's strategy, Amadeus, a travel technology company, said the new model would make "comparison and transparency more difficult because travellers will now be forced to go to multiple channels to search for the best fares. For the period between 1–14 September, the airline experienced a 16.1% drop in revenue, indicating to some that the new fee backfired, although the airline maintains the statement that the decrease was due to the pilot strike, and "other seasonal effects".

Deportation flights
Pro-migration activists from Germany have criticised Lufthansa for performing deportation flights on behalf of the German government. In 2019, 4,573 people were deported on their planes, while their subsidiary Eurowings performed 1,312 deportations. This totals more than 25% of deportations in Germany in 2019. At least two deportees perished during transport.

Treatment of Nazi-era past 
Lufthansa has been criticized for lack of transparency about the use of more than 10,000 forced laborers, many of them children, by its predecessor company, Deutsche Luft Hansa, during World War II.

Ghost flights 
Lufthansa operated 18,000 empty or near-empty flights in winter 2021–2022 to avoid losing take-off and landing rights at major airports.

Alleged collective punishment of visibly Jewish passengers 
In 2022, the company allegedly engaged in collective punishment of visibly Jewish passengers. After a small minority of Jewish passengers did not comply with COVID masking rules on a flight from New York to Frankfurt, the company barred over a hundred visibly Jewish passengers from a connecting flight to Budapest. Lufthansa called in dozens of armed federal police to enforce its policy. A supervisor from Lufthansa  explained to passengers that "everyone has to pay for a couple" as "It's Jews coming from JFK. Jewish people who were the mess, who made the problems." The video of Lufthansa supervisor's statement has been compared to the treatment of Jews during the Holocaust. Lufthansa confirmed that it barred a group of passengers from the flight.

German police reacted with rage when passengers asked "why do you hate us?" and used the word Nazi. The German Federal Police confirmed they were called to "presence" at the scene, and in response to later questions said that "Lufthansa called us and said that some of this group from JFK were not following the rules" and that they "did not make any decision at all about who could fly and who could not. As the police even if we did think that their decision was discriminatory, as the police we can’t then make the decision about who can and who cannot fly."

The American Jewish Committee stated that "Banning ALL Jews from a flight because of an alleged mask violation by some Jewish passengers is textbook antisemitism from Lufthansa". German MP Marlene Schönberger said that if the reports are true, then "there must be consequences" as "Excluding Jews from a flight because they were recognizable as Jewish is a scandal. I expect German companies in particular to be aware of anti-Semitism."

Lufthansa denied its actions were antisemitic saying that "We consider the claim of anti-Semitism to be unwarranted and without merit". Lufthansa later said it wishes to investigate the incident internally. Lufthansa was condemned by US envoy Deborah Lipstadt who described Lufthansa's anti-Semitism as "unbelievable", and stated that her office was in contact with the German government over the incident that involved US citizens.

In August 2022, as a result of the incident, Lufthansa adopted the IHRA Working Definition of Antisemitism and appointed a senior manager to prevent  antisemitism and discrimination.

Banning of Apple AirTags on aircraft 
In October 2022, according to Simple Flying, Lufthansa has reportedly banned all Apple AirTags to track traveler's luggage. When a passenger's bag contains an AirTag, it often creates problems at the airport. "Airlines have realized that these tracking devices allow passengers to recognize that their bags have gone missing, potentially before the airline. Such as reports of a traveler requesting to find his bag or be offloaded himself by the simple tracking of an apple AirTag. Such simple requests could affect an airline's on-time performance and create knock-on effects for passengers that may have connecting flights." Simple Flying had written.

International Air Transport Association (IATA) has not included AirTags or trackers in its Dangerous Goods Regulations manual. IATA rules have stated that "electronic devices in checked luggage must be completely turned off." European airports, especially Frankfurt am Main, were highlighted in losing baggage, and this also had forced the German flag carrier to take this decision.

One month later, fellow Star Alliance Member Air New Zealand issued an advisory against baggage trackers.

See also
 Air transport in Germany
 List of airlines of Germany

References

Footnotes

Citations

Bibliography

External links

 Official website 
 

 
Lufthansa Group
Airlines established in 1953
1953 establishments in West Germany
Airlines of Germany
Association of European Airlines members
Companies listed on the Frankfurt Stock Exchange
Multinational companies headquartered in Germany
Companies based in Cologne
German brands
Star Alliance
German companies established in 1953
Antisemitism in Germany